Spilomyia triangulata is a species of Hoverfly in the family Syrphidae.

Distribution
Turkey.

References

Eristalinae
Insects described in 2000
Diptera of Asia